The 1921 Cairo Conference, described in the official minutes as Middle East Conference held in Cairo and Jerusalem, March 12 to 30, 1921, was a series of meetings by British officials for examining and discussing Middle Eastern problems, and to frame a common policy. The secret conference of British experts created the blueprint for British control in both Iraq and Transjordan. By offering nominal leadership of those two regions to the sons of the Sharif of the Mecca, Churchill felt that the spirit if not the actual letter of Britain's wartime promises to the Arabs were fulfilled.

Particular concerns of the conference were to resolve the conflicting policies defined in the McMahon letters (1915), the Sykes-Picot agreement (1916) and the Balfour Declaration (1917). Winston Churchill, the newly appointed Colonial Secretary, called all the British Military Leaders and civil administrators in the Middle East to a conference at the Semiramis hotel in Cairo to discuss these issues. It was an experimental conference organized by the Colonial Office, with the purpose to solve problems more efficiently, with improved communications, without protracted correspondence.

The conference's most significant outcome was the decision to implement the Sharifian Solution: Abdullah bin Hussein was to administer the territory east of the Jordan River, Transjordan, and his brother Faisal was to become king of a newly created Kingdom of Iraq; both were to continue to receive direction and financial support from Great Britain. It was also agreed that Lebanon and Syria should remain under French control, Britain should maintain the mandate over Palestine and continue to support the establishment of a Jewish Homeland there, Husain, the Sharif of Mecca, was to be recognized as King of the Hejaz and Abdul Aziz ibn Saud left in control of the Nejd in the heart of the Arabian Desert.

Prelude
During 1920 a popular uprising had broken out in Mesopatamia, which had been occupied by the British since World War I. The British army had suffered hundreds of casualties. and sections of the British press were calling for the ending of British control. T.E. Lawrence, whose wartime activities were beginning to capture the public imagination and who had strong attachments to the Husain dynasty based in the Hejaz, was lobbying the British Government on behalf of Emir Feisal. The Emir's attempt to establish a kingdom with Damascus as its capital had been thwarted by the French army. In November 1920 Feisal's older brother Abdullah appeared with several hundred followers in the town of Ma'an and announced his intention of attacking the French occupation in modern-day Syria and Lebanon and restoring his brother to power there.

Churchill's task as the new Colonial Secretary with special responsibility for the Middle East, was to find a solution to the unrest in Iraq and satisfy the aspirations of the Husains. He appointed Lawrence as his special advisor. They held a series of meetings with Feisal in London prior to the conference.

Most of the decisions about the future of Iraq had been already taken in London; Feisal should become king of a new Kingdom of Iraq, to be approved by a plebiscite of the local population. Once installed, the King would sign a friendship treaty or Alliance with Great Britain. In a major policy change, with Lawrence arguing strongly in favour, it was decided that security in the area should be transferred from the army to the Royal Air Force. By the time the conference started the British army had managed to crush the revolt in Mesopotamia, at a cost of £40–50 million, with over 400 British soldiers and over 10,000 Iraqis killed. It was anticipated that the new policy would make significant financial savings.

Conference

On 12 March 1921, the conference was convened at the Semiramis Hotel in Cairo and was attended by all the senior military and civil figures from Palestine and Mesopotamia. The two Arabs present were members of the Mesopotamian Mandate administration. Churchill described the gathering, which lasted two weeks, as one of "Forty Thieves" and spent his leisure time practising his new hobby of oil painting and working on the manuscript of his history of the First World War, The World Crisis.
	
The agenda consisted of three sections: Iraq, Palestine (including Transjordan), Aden and the Persian Gulf. The Judiciary, Finance, the size of the British Army garrison and the proposed Legislative Council were all on the agenda. An Arab delegation from Palestine met Churchill in Cairo briefly on 22 March, at which he refused to discuss anything political but agreed to meet them in Jerusalem. The issue of Trans-Jordania was complicated by the arrival of Abdullah's army in Amman, with an influx of rebels and refugees from Syria and the fact that the Zionists regarded Transjordan as part of the promised Jewish Homeland. Churchill held a series of meetings with Abdullah in Jerusalem on his way back to London.

The only public announcement on the decisions made during the conference, was a report made by Winston Churchill to the House of Commons on 14 June 1921. It drew little comment from the press and the conference is barely mentioned in the published letters and autobiographies of the main participants.

Jerusalem meetings
On 24 March 1921, the Palestine Mission continued its work in Jerusalem. In Gaza, Churchill's train was met by a large demonstration against the British Mandate of Palestine. He met the mayor of Gaza and other leaders and was presented with a list of demands which had been put forward by the Muslim-Christian Associations in Haifa. Winston Churchill and Herbert Samuel, supposing they were welcomed by the inhabitants, waved to the protesting crowds, who were chanting anti-Jewish slogans.

Meeting with Emir Abdullah 

On 28 March, Secretary of State for the Colonies Winston Churchill had several meetings with Emir Abdullah. Abdullah had already established himself in Amman and was threatening to proceed further northwards. Churchill proposed to constitute Transjordan as an Arab province under an Arab Governor, who would recognise British control over his Administration and be responsible to the High Commissioners for Palestine and Transjordan.  Abdullah argued that he should be given control of the entire area of Mandate Palestine responsible to the High Commissioner. Alternatively he advocated a union with the territory promised to his brother (Iraq). Churchill rejected both demands.

Responding to Abdullah's fear for a Jewish kingdom west of the Jordan, Churchill decreed it was not only not contemplated "that hundreds and thousands of Jews were going to pour into the country in a very short time and dominate the existing population", but even was quite impossible. "Jewish immigration would be a very slow process and the rights of the existing non-Jewish population would be strictly preserved." "Trans-Jordania would not be included in the present administrative system of Palestine, and therefore the Zionist clauses of the mandate would not apply.  Hebrew would not be made an official language in Trans-Jordania, and the local Government would not be expected to adopt any measures to promote Jewish immigration and colonisation." About British policy in Palestine, Herbert Samuel added that "There was no question of setting up a Jewish Government there ... No land would be taken from any Arab, nor would the Moslem religion be touched in any way."

The British representatives suggested that if Abdullah were able to control the anti-French actions of the Syrian Nationalists it would reduce French opposition to his brother's candidature for Mesopotamia, and might even lead to the appointment of Abdullah himself as Emir of Syria in Damascus.  In the end, Abdullah agreed to halting his advance towards the French and to administer the territory east of the Jordan River for a six-month trial period during which he would be given a British subsidy of £5,000 per month.

Meeting with the Palestinian Arab delegation 

After the conversations with the Emir, Churchill met a delegation of the 1920 Haifa Congress, representing Palestinian Muslims and Christians, and led by Musa al-Husayni. They handed over a memorandum, which sounded a strong protest against British policies in Palestine.  They complained that Great Britain "under the financial stress of the war, had sold their country to Zionists".  They added that England, "disregarding the feelings of the inhabitants, has appointed a Jew as High Commissioner", despite "the fact that the predominating majority of the people he governs are not of his own race or faith".  "To the most important post of justice in Palestine, namely that of Legal Secretary, or Minister of Justice, a Jew has been appointed.  And what is worse, this official is an out and out Zionist."

The delegation contested the legal validity of the Balfour Declaration, which had staked the historical claims of the Jews, according to the logic of which "the Arabs should claim Spain since once upon a time they conquered it and there developed a high civilisation."  They criticised charged customs and trade competition, and warned for Zionists dominating the market.  They protested against the buying up of lands, they criticized as costly; less than necessary projects to employ Jewish immigrants at double salaries, though doing less works, at a cost to public education. "...the highest posts with fat salaries are given to the Jews", the delegates complained, "while the native official, who is more conversant with local needs, is relegated to a third-class position, with a salary too little for his needs and out of all proportion with his work".

The delegation objected to the draft Mandate for Palestine, which added nothing to Arab rights already derived from existing law, but gave the British her right of handing over to the Jews Crown lands which are not her own. "On the other hand, the Jews have been granted a true advantage, namely, that of becoming our rulers". They called for the rescinding of the Balfour Declaration and the establishment of an elected Parliament and a suspension of Jewish immigration.

In reply to the statement, Churchill called the paper partisan and one-sided, with a great many untrue statements. As the Balfour Declaration was ratified by the Allied Powers, it was an established fact. The National Home for the Jews would be "good for the world, good for the Jews and good for the British Empire ... good for the Arabs who dwell in Palestine". He emphasized that Balfour spoke of "the establishment in Palestine of a National Home for the Jews", and did not say he would make Palestine the National Home for the Jews".  It "does not mean that it will cease to be the National Home of other people, or that a Jewish Government will be set up to dominate the Arab people."  The British Government "cherish a strong friendship and desire for co-operation with the Arab race as a whole. That is what you would expect from the  British Empire, which is the greatest of all the Muslem States in the world ..." Churchill continued his speech by explaining the appointment of Samuel as High Commissioner.  He was appointed because of his training and experience.  Because he was a Jew, "in holding the balance even and securing fair tradement for all he could not be reproached for being hostile to his own people, and he was believed by them when he said that he was only doing what was just and fair;".  Samuel then spoke of the great advantages the Jewish immigration brought to Palestine as a whole. He refused to promise any changes to British policy.

Meeting with the Jewish National Council 

The Jewish National Council of Palestine, representing the Palestinian Jews, presented a memorandum to Winston Churchill.  They expressed their gratitude towards Britain for supporting "the rebuilding of the Jewish National Home" and trusted that the realisation of it would "be made possible by giving Palestine its historical frontiers".  They declared that "by our efforts to rebuild the Jewish National Home, which is but a small area in comparison with all the Arab lands, we do not deprive them of their legitimate rights".  They lauded the results of the Jewish colonisation in the past forty years.  They asked for charging the Jewish people with the development of State lands and non-private uncultivated lands, and the development of the natural resources of the country.

The Imperial Cabinet was "perfectly convinced that the cause of Zionism is one which carries with it much that is good for the whole world, and not only for the Jewish people, but that it will also bring with it prosperity and contentment and advancement to the Arab population of this country".  He believed "that you were animated by the very highest spirit of justice and idealism, and that your work would in fact confer blessings upon the whole country".  Zionists should be forewarned to anticipate adverse criticism from the majority population.  The Colonial Secretary concluded that he had read the memorandum "with great interest and sympathy".

Churchill's speech at the Hebrew University 

On 29 March 1921, Churchill made a speech at the Hebrew University in Jerusalem.  He unveiled that his heart was full of sympathy for Zionism for twelve years ago, since he had met the Manchester Jews.  Once more reiterating the blessings of a Jewish National Home for the whole world, the Jewish race and Great Britain: the inhabitants of Palestine would greatly depend on its auditors, the Jews of Palestine. By taking the right steps Palestine would transform into a paradise as foretold in the scriptures, "a land flowing with milk and honey, in which sufferers of all races and religions will find a rest from their sufferings".

Aftermath 

Lawrence concluded that Churchill had "made straight all the tangle" and that Britain had fulfilled "our promises in letter and spirit ... without sacrificing any interest of our Empire or any interest of the people concerned." One of Lawrence's biographers comments that the conference "heralded a period of unrest in the Middle East which had scarcely been surpassed even under Ottoman rule."

Participants
Winston Churchill - Secretary of State for the Colonies
T.E. Lawrence - Special Advisor to Colonial Office
Maj. Hubert Young - Colonial Office
Herbert Samuel - High Commissioner of Palestine
Sir Percy Cox - High Commissioner of Iraq
Gertrude Bell - Oriental Secretary for High Commissioner of Iraq
Ja'afar al'Askari - Minister of Defence in the first Government of Iraq
Air Marshal Sir Hugh Trenchard - Chief of the Air Staff
Air Vice-Marshal Sir Geoffrey Salmond - Air Officer Commanding Middle East
Sasun Hasqail - Minister of Finance in the first Government of Iraq
Geoffrey Francis Archer - Governor British Somalia
Field Marshal Edmund Allenby - High Commissioner of Egypt

See also
 Cairo Conference (disambiguation)
 Sharifian Solution
 Emirate of Transjordan
 Kingdom of Iraq (Mandate administration)
 Mandatory Palestine

References

Further reading
 Faught, C. Brad. Cairo 1921: Ten Days that Made the Middle East (Yale University Press, 2022).
 Friedman, Isaiah. "How Trans-Jordan was severed from the territory of the Jewish National Home." Journal of Israeli History 27.1 (2008): 65–85.
 Fromkin, David. A Peace to End All Peace: The Fall of the Ottoman Empire and the Creation of the Modern Middle East (1989) pp 493–529. 
 Klieman, Aaron S. Foundations of British policy in the Arab world: The Cairo Conference of 1921 (Johns Hopkins Press, 1970).
 Mejcher, Helmut. "Iraq's external relations 1921–26." Middle Eastern Studies 13.3 (1977): 340–358.
 Sluglett, Peter. Britain in Iraq: contriving king and country, 1914-1932 (Columbia University Press, 2007). ch 1.

Diplomatic conferences in Egypt
Political history of Iraq
Mandatory Palestine
Emirate of Transjordan
Conferences in Cairo
1921 conferences
1921 in Egypt
1921 in Transjordan
1921 in Mandatory Palestine
1920s in Cairo
1921 in Iraq
1921 in the British Empire
March 1921 events